Paul Mouterde (1892– 14 January 1972) was a French Jesuit missionary and naturalist, and the director of the Oriental Library at the Saint Joseph University of Beirut. 

He published two previously unknown homilies of fifth-century Syriac poet-theologian Jacob of Serugh, and multiple works on Levantine flora, including a three-volume work on the flora of Lebanon and Syria.

Early life 
Paul Mouterde was born in 1862 in Bruyères, in the French Department of Vosges. His father was Professor of Law at the Catholic University of Lyon.

Selected works 

 Petite flore des environs de Beyrouth (1935)
 La Flore du Djebel Druze (1953)
 Deux homélies inédites de Jacques de Saroug (1944) 
 Nouvelle flore du Liban et de la Syrie (1966–1978)

References

Citations

Sources 

 
 
 
 
 
 
 
 
 

1892 births
1972 deaths
20th-century French zoologists
20th-century French botanists
French Jesuits
20th-century French biologists
French ethnologists